USSC may refer to:

Government
United States Supreme Court, the highest federal court of the United States
United States Sentencing Commission, an agency responsible for stating the sentencing guidelines for the United States federal courts

Military
United States Space Command, a unified combatant command of the U.S. Armed Forces
United States Sanitary Commission, a relief agency that supported injured soldiers of the U.S. Army during the American Civil War

Other uses
United States Studies Centre, a non-profit organization headquartered at University of Sydney
United States Surgical Corporation, a former manufacturer of medical devices

See also
 USSF (disambiguation)
 SC (disambiguation)